

Berhthun (or Beorhthun; died  778) was a medieval Bishop of Lichfield.

Berhthun was consecrated about 769 and died between 777 and 779.

Citations

References

External links
 

770s deaths
8th-century English bishops
Anglo-Saxon bishops of Lichfield
Year of birth unknown